The murder of Megan Nicole Kanka (December 7, 1986 – July 29, 1994) occurred in Hamilton Township, Mercer County, New Jersey, United States. Seven-year-old Megan Kanka was raped and murdered by her neighbor, Jesse Timmendequas, after he lured her into his house; Timmendequas had previously been convicted for child molestation. The murder attracted national attention and subsequently led to the introduction of "Megan's Law", which requires law enforcement to disclose details relating to the location of registered sex offenders.

In 1997, Timmendequas was convicted of Kanka's murder. He was initially sentenced to death, but his sentence was commuted to life without parole after New Jersey abolished capital punishment in 2007.

Perpetrator 
Jesse K. Timmendequas (born April 15, 1961) had two previous convictions for sexually assaulting young girls. In 1979, he pleaded guilty to the attempted aggravated sexual assault of a five-year-old girl in Piscataway Township, New Jersey. He was given a suspended sentence, and after failing to attend counseling, he was sent for nine months to the Middlesex Adult Correctional Center. In 1981, Timmendequas pleaded guilty to the assault of a seven-year-old girl, and was imprisoned at the Adult Diagnostic & Treatment Center (ADTC) in Avenel, New Jersey, for six years.

Timmendequas reportedly participated little in the treatment program offered at the ADTC. He was described by one therapist who treated him at the facility as a "whiner" who spent most of his time sleeping. Another therapist stated that she had believed that Timmendequas would eventually commit another sex crime (although she did not believe he would commit murder).

Murder and trial 
Timmendequas lured Kanka into his house, where he raped her before strangling her with a belt. He then disposed of her body in nearby Mercer County Park. The next day, he confessed to investigators and led police to the site.

Evidence included bloodstains, hair, and fiber samples, as well as a bite mark matching Kanka's teeth on Timmendequas' hand, and led to a guilty verdict on charges of kidnapping, four counts of aggravated sexual assault, and two counts of felony murder—causing a death in the course of certain specific felonies.  The court sentenced Timmendequas to death, and the sentence was upheld by the New Jersey Supreme Court on appeal. Congressman Dick Zimmer stated, "I believe he is exactly the kind of predator that the legislature had in mind when it enacted the death penalty."

Timmendequas remained on death row in New Jersey until December 17, 2007, when the New Jersey Legislature abolished capital punishment in the state. As a result, Timmendequas' sentence was commuted to life in prison without the possibility of parole.

Megan's Law 

One month after the murder, the New Jersey General Assembly passed a series of bills proposed by Assemblyman Paul Kramer that would require sex offender registry, with a database tracked by the state, community notification of registered sex offenders moving into a neighborhood and then life in prison for repeat sex offenders. Kramer expressed incredulity at the controversy created by the bills, saying that "Megan K would be alive today" if the bills he proposed had been law.

Foundation 
The Megan Nicole Kanka Foundation is a non-profit charity founded by the family of Megan Kanka with the intent of preventing crimes against children.

See also 
List of kidnappings
Murder of Sarah Payne, a 2000 crime in the United Kingdom that led to the creation of Sarah's Law, a more limited form of Megan's Law.

References

External links 
 Megan Nicole Kanka Foundation

1986 births
1994 deaths
1994 in New Jersey
1994 murders in the United States
Deaths by person in New Jersey
Formerly missing people
Incidents of violence against girls
July 1994 crimes
Mercer County, New Jersey
Murdered American children
Murder in New Jersey
Rape in the 1990s
Rapes in the United States